Medicinal Liquor Prescriptions Act of 1933 is a United States federal statute establishing prescription limitations for physicians possessing a permit to dispense medicinal liquor. The public law seek to abolish the use of the medicinal liquor prescription form introducing medicinal liquor revenue stamps as a substitution for official prescription blanks.

The Act of Congress amended Title II - Prohibition of Intoxicating Beverages as enacted by the National Prohibition Act of 1919. The alcohol prohibition law, better known as the Volstead Act, was amended twelve years before by the 67th United States Congress authorizing dispensary restrictions of ethyl alcohol by druggists or physicians. The public law was entitled the National Prohibition Supplemental Act of 1921.

The 72nd United States Congress pursued passage of a medicinal liquor regulatory bill ahead of the Congressional session expiration occurring on March 4, 1933. House bill 14395 went before the United States House of Representatives on February 25, 1933 resulting in a one hundred and sixty-eight to one hundred and sixty narrow margin vote.

Senate bill 562 was passed by the 73rd U.S. Congress and enacted into law by President Franklin Roosevelt on March 31, 1933.

See also

Illustrations

References

Periodical Bibliography

External links
 
 
 
 
 

1933 in American law
1933 in the United States
73rd United States Congress
Prohibition in the United States